Grudusk-Olszak  is a village in the administrative district of Gmina Grudusk, within Ciechanów County, Masovian Voivodeship, in east-central Poland. The district has a population of 3750, with 245 Business entities.

References

Grudusk-Olszak